Charaxes tectonis, the mountain silver-barred charaxes, is a butterfly in the family Nymphalidae. It is found in Nigeria and Cameroon. The habitat consists of sub-montane and montane forests.

Subspecies
Charaxes tectonis tectonis (eastern Nigeria, Cameroon: west to the Bamenda Forest and Mount Oku)
Charaxes tectonis nebularum Darge, 1977. (Cameroon: Manengouba massif)

Related species
Historical attempts to assemble a cluster of presumably related species into a "Charaxes jasius Group" have not been wholly convincing. More recent taxonomic revision, corroborated by phylogenetic research, allow a more rational grouping congruent with cladistic relationships. Within a well-populated clade of 27 related species sharing a common ancestor approximately 16 mya during the Miocene, 26 are now considered together as The jasius Group.  One of the two lineages within this clade forms a robust monophyletic group of seven species sharing a common ancestor approximately 2-3 mya, i.e. during the Pliocene, and are considered as the jasius subgroup. The second lineage leads to 19 other species within the Jasius group, which are split in to three well-populated subgroups of closely related species.

The jasius Group (26 Species):

Clade 1: jasius subgroup (7 species)

Clade 2: contains the well-populated three additional subgroups (19 species) of the jasius Group: called the brutus, pollux, and eudoxus subgroups.

the eudoxus subgroup (11 species):
Charaxes eudoxus
Charaxes lucyae
Charaxes richelmanni
Charaxes musakensis
Charaxes biokensis[stat.rev.2005]
Charaxes ducarmei
Charaxes druceanus
Charaxes tectonis
Charaxes phraortes
Charaxes andranodorus
Charaxes andrefana[stat.rev.2025]

Further exploration of the phylogenetic relationships amongst existing Charaxes taxa is required to improve clarity.

References

External links
Charaxes tectonis tectonis images at Consortium for the Barcode of Life
Charaxes tectonis nebularum images at BOLD

Butterflies described in 1937
tectonis